Institut National de Jeunes Sourds de Paris (National Institute for Deaf Children of Paris) is the current name of the school for the Deaf founded by Charles-Michel de l'Épée, in stages, between 1750 and 1760 in Paris, France.

After the death of Père Vanin in 1759, the Abbé de l'Épée was introduced to two deaf girls who were in need of a new instructor.  The school began in 1760 and shortly thereafter was opened to the public and became the world's first free school for the deaf. It was originally located in a house at 14 rue des Moulins, butte Saint-Roch, near the Louvre in Paris. On July 29, 1791, the French legislature approved government funding for the school and it was renamed: "Institution Nationale des Sourds-Muets à Paris."

Prosper Menière was the first physician in chief in 1760.

References

External links
Institut National de Jeunes Sourds de Paris (INJS)

Deafness organizations
Education in Paris
Educational institutions established in 1760
1760 establishments in France
Schools for the deaf
French Sign Language